Captain Anketell Moutray Read VC (27 October 1884 – 25 September 1915) was a British Army officer and an English recipient of the Victoria Cross (VC), the highest and most prestigious award for gallantry in the face of the enemy that can be awarded to British and Commonwealth forces.

Background
He was the son of Col. J. Moutray Read of Cheltenham and Mrs. E. Moutray Read of St. Leonards on Sea, East Sussex. He was born in October 1884 and educated at Glengarth preparatory school, Cheltenham, and at the United Services College, Westward Ho!, and passed directly into Sandhurst in 1901. Gazetted to the Gloucester Regiment, he served with them three years in India. He transferred to the Seventh Hariana Lancers, and exchanged to the Northants. Regiment in 1911. He joined the Royal Flying Corps in 1912, and went with them to France with the first Expeditionary Force in August 1914. He fought at Mons and in the retreat to the Marne. He was attached to the 9th Lancers, and while with them was severely wounded during the fighting on the Aisne in September 1914.

Captain Moutray Read was well known as an athlete and won the heavyweight championship (boxing) of India eight times, and the middle-weight twice. He also won the Army and Navy heavyweight championship at Aldershot and Portsmouth three times, an unequalled record. During one match, an opponent recalls wishing to throw in the towel against him, citing his "devastating jab". As a result, Capt. Moutray Read earned the nickname of "Widowmaker".

Mrs. Moutray Read received news of her son's death while living at 3 Wentworth Place, Wicklow, Co. Wicklow, also a British Army Field Hospital Supplies Depot. Captain Moutray Read is listed on a brass commemorative plaque along with other local men at Wicklow Parish Church, Wicklow, Co. Wicklow. He is also commemorated by a plaque on the wall of the Church of St. Michael and All Angels in Bampton, where his father owned Castle Grove, a fine house on the edge of this small town in Devonshire. Anketell's niece, Miss Henrietta Desirée Moutray Read, lived at Castle Grove marrying Sir Christopher William Gerald Henry Codrington in 1969. Anketell's elder sister Rose Moutray Read was an author and horticulturist.

Details
He was 30 years old, and a captain in the 1st Battalion, The Northamptonshire Regiment, British Army during the First World War when the following deed took place for which he was awarded the VC.

On 25 September 1915 near Hulluch, France, Captain Moutray Read, although partially gassed, went out several times in order to rally parties of different units which were disorganised and retiring. He led them back into the firing line and regardless of danger to himself, moved about under withering fire, encouraging them, but he was mortally wounded while carrying out this gallant work. He had shown conspicuous bravery on other occasions, particularly on the night of 29/30 July when he carried out of action an officer who was mortally wounded, under a hot fire of rifle and grenades.

Further information
Captain Moutray Read is buried in the Dud Corner Cemetery, Le Rutoire, near Loos-en-Gohelle, France, 2 miles NW of Lens, Plot VII, Row F, Grave 19.

The medal
His Victoria Cross is on loan to and displayed at the Abington Park Museum, Northampton, England.

References

Sources
David Harvey (1999) Monuments to Courage 
The Register of the Victoria Cross (This England, 1997)
Peter F. Batchelor & Christopher Matson (1999) VCs of the First World War – The Western Front 1915 
The Irish Times (4 October, p. 6, 27 November 1915) p. 7, and (11 December 1915) p. 24.
The Wicklow News-Letter (9 October 1915)
The London Gazette 29371, (16 November 1915)

1884 births
1915 deaths
Burials in France
Northamptonshire Regiment officers
British World War I recipients of the Victoria Cross
British military personnel killed in World War I
British Army personnel of World War I
People from Cheltenham
Royal Flying Corps officers
People educated at United Services College
British Army recipients of the Victoria Cross
Military personnel from Gloucestershire